Accounting Research Bulletins were documents issued by the US Committee on Accounting Procedure between 1938 and 1959 on various accounting problems. They were discontinued with the dissolution of the Committee in 1959 under a recommendation from the Special Committee on Research Program. In all, 17 bulletins were issued; however, the lack of binding authority over AICPA's membership reduced the influence of, and compliance with, the content of the bulletins. The Accounting Research Bulletins have all been superseded by the Accounting Standards Codification (ASC).

With the permission of the AICPA, the full text of Accounting Research Bulletins has been posted on the website of the J.D. Williams Library of the University of Mississippi.

List of Accounting Research Bulletins

References

Accounting in the United States
Accounting research